August Heinrich Klostermann (16 May 1837, Steinhude, Schaumburg-Lippe – 11 February 1915, Kiel) was a German Lutheran theologian. He was the father of New Testament scholar Erich Klostermann (1870–1963).

Biography
He studied at Erlangen University and Berlin (1855–58). He was assistant pastor in Bückeburg (1859–64), and then tutor and lecturer at Göttingen (1864–68). In 1868, he became professor of Old Testament exegesis at Kiel.

Works
 Vindicae Lucanae (Göttingen, 1866).
 Das Markus evangelium nach seinem Quellenwerthe für die evangelische geschichte (Göttingen, 1867) – The Gospel of Mark according to source values in regards to gospel history.
 Untersuchungen zur alttestamentlichen Theologie (Gotha, 1868) – Studies of Old Testament theology.
 Probleme im Aposteltext neu erörtert (1883) – Problems of the Apostle texts newly discussed. 
 Ueber deutsche Art bei Martin Luther (1884) – On German art by Martin Luther.
 Die Bücher Samuelis und der Könige ausgelegt (Nördlingen, 1887) – The Books of Samuel and Kings interpreted.
 Zur Theorie der biblischen Weissagung und zur Charakteristik des Hebräerbriefes (1889) – The theory of biblical "Weissangung" and the characteristic of the Letter to the Hebrews.
 Deuterojesaia, hebräisch und deutsch (Munich, 1893) – Deutero-Isaiah, Hebrew and German.
 Der Pentateuch (1893) – The Pentateuch.
 Geschichte des Volkes Israel bis zur Restauration unter Esra und Nehemia, 1896 – History of Israel until the restoration under Ezra and Nehemiah. 
 Schulwesen in alten Israel (Leipzig, 1908) – Education in ancient Israel.

References

 

1837 births
1915 deaths
People from Wunstorf
German Lutheran theologians
Humboldt University of Berlin alumni
University of Erlangen-Nuremberg alumni
Academic staff of the University of Kiel
19th-century German Protestant theologians
19th-century German Lutheran clergy
19th-century German male writers
German male non-fiction writers
20th-century German Lutheran clergy